Ian Armstrong may refer to:

Ian Armstrong (politician) (1937–2020), Australian politician, Deputy Premier of New South Wales
Ian Armstrong (artist) (1923–2005), Australian classical modernist painter and print maker
Ian Armstrong (footballer) (born 1981), English football player